Oswestry United Football Club was a football club from Shropshire, playing at Victoria Road. The club was formed in September 1893 after the demise of Oswestry Town in 1891. They joined the Shropshire & District League.

The club won the Shropshire Senior Cup in 1899 and 1909, and won the Welsh Cup in 1901 and in 1907.

Demise
In September 1914 it was reported that the club had lost five players due to World War I, and it was likely that the club would no longer be able to continue in the Lancashire Combination League. By October 1914 the club are shown to have only played two fixtures in the league. 
The club were due to play a Shropshire Cup fixture with Shrewsbury Town in March 1915, but could not raise a team and were later ejected from the competition. 

When football started again after World War I the club did not re-emerge.

League history

Honours

Cup
Welsh Cup
1900–01, 1906–07

Shropshire Senior Cup
1898–99, 1908–09

References

Defunct football clubs in Shropshire
Oswestry